Boom Radio (also Boom Radio UK) is an independent, commercial, national radio station in the United Kingdom. Owned by Boom Radio Ltd, the station is aimed at baby boomers, the generation of people born between 1946 and 1964, and is the first radio station in the UK to specifically target this age demographic. Launched on 14 February 2021, Boom Radio broadcasts nationally on the Sound Digital DAB multiplex and is also available online.

The station was developed and launched by Phil Riley and David Lloyd, two commercial radio executives who felt older listeners were being overlooked by stations such as BBC Radio 2 in favour of a younger audience, and Boom plans to compete with Radio 2. Boom's content features a mixture of music, conversation and radio personality, with presenters including many who have previously made their name in national and commercial radio, such as Graham Dene, David Hamilton and Diana Luke. The programming for Boom Radio is recorded and presented remotely by its presenters from their own homes, rather than being done in a traditional in-house studio setting. Boom's launch against the backdrop of the COVID-19 pandemic influenced its decision to operate without a central studio, and it is believed to be the first national UK station without such a facility.

History
The idea for Boom Radio was conceived and developed by Phil Riley and David Lloyd, two radio executives with lengthy careers in commercial radio, who felt there was a gap in the market for a station aimed at the baby boomer generation, which they felt was being overlooked by other stations. Riley's background in radio includes his role as Chief Executive of Chrysalis Radio, where he oversaw the launch of Heart, and the network's eventual sale to Global Radio, while Lloyd has worked both in presenting and executive roles at stations such as LBC and Virgin.

Plans for the launch of Boom Radio were announced on 23 November 2020, when Riley and Lloyd confirmed the station would launch on DAB early the following year. Named for the generation it planned to cater for, Boom Radio would initially be available in London, Birmingham, Bristol, Portsmouth and Glasgow, as well as broadcasting online, and offer a mix of music, conversation and presenter personality. Speaking about Boom Radio, Riley said, "Our own research has found radio is still the most popular medium for the Boomer generation, yet the majority feel that the industry is geared more towards younger people. We see Boom Radio filling that gap".

On 2 December the station announced a round of executive appointments to its commercial team, drawing on people with experience at large media companies such as Global and Sky. Dawn Le Men, former Head of Media Partners at Sky, was appointed as Boom's Head of Sales, while Ali Page, former Director of Client and Category Development for Global, was appointed to be Client Development Adviser. It was also announced that Don Thomson, a former Chief Operations Officer at Global, and who had also worked in roles for Yorkshire Television and Chrysalis Radio, would join the board of Boom Radio as a Non-Executive Director.

On 11 January 2021 the station unveiled its inaugural schedule and list of presenters, with Graham Dene (formerly of Smooth Radio and Capital Radio) presenting the weekday breakfast show. Other weekday presenters would include David Hamilton, Nicky Horne and Diana Luke, while Greg Edwards would present a soul programme and Anna Raeburn would relaunch her Talk to Anna programme. Other programmes planned for Boom Radio include a show with Esther Rantzen and her daughter, Rebecca Wilcox, Still Busy Living, described as the station's own version of Desert Island Discs, and programming covering topics such as gardening and book reviews. On 14 January Travel Weekly reported that Silver Travel Advisor, a mature travel information hub, had signed an exclusive deal to provide travel content for Boom Radio. As part of this deal, it was announced that a weekly Silver Travel Show would air on Sunday evenings, as well as a monthly podcast presented by Jennie Carr, Silver Travel Advisor's creative director. Also in January, Boom Radio confirmed it had signed a deal with online dating platform provider White Label Dating to launch Boom Singles, a dating website for its target audience.

Boom Radio was officially launched at 10.00am on 14 February 2021, with Graham Dene being the first presenter to be heard on the station. The first song to be played was "All You Need is Love" by The Beatles. The station also dedicated its own poem, An Ode to Boomers, to its audience.

Following the initial launch the station planned to expand to DAB in other parts of the UK throughout 2021. But on 11 March it was confirmed the station would launch nationally on the Sound Digital multiplex from the following day. The announcement was made on air by presenter David Hamilton and on social media with a letter to its listeners: "The response has been so strong that we’ve brought forward all our plans to grow. You told us you wanted us on DAB across the UK and from Friday – we will be!" The Nottingham Post subsequently reported that positive audience figures from the station's first two weeks on air, as well as feedback from listeners, had prompted Boom's investors to finance the national launch.

On 19 October 2021 it was announced that David Elms, Head of Media at KPMG, had joined the board of Boom Radio as non-executive chairman.

On 3 June 2022 Boom Radio announced plans to launch a spin-off station in July. Boom Light plays music from the 1950s, standards and easy listening, and would be initially available online and via smart devices, as well as on DAB in Salisbury with plans to expand its DAB output. In October 2022 Boom launched a £1m television advertising campaign featuring presenter David Hamilton.

On 21 November 2022, it was announced that Paul O'Grady would join Boom Radio to present a show on Christmas Day similar to the one he presented for BBC Radio 2.

Broadcasting
Boom Radio went on air against the backdrop of the COVID-19 pandemic and opted to follow a model whereby its presenters were presenting their shows remotely from home-based studios. Riley has described this approach as "taking advantage of what’s been happening in lockdown to completely rethink how you run a radio station”. Kevin Hilton of the International Broadcasting Convention writes that Boom Radio is believed to be the first national UK radio station not to have a central studio building.

In order to put together the technology needed to establish a radio station with this model of broadcasting, Riley and Lloyd employed the services of Quentin Howard, an executive with experience in launching in excess of 30 stations. Following research, Boom Radio chose RCS Sound Software to host its content. Some of the presenters already had home studios, but for those who didn't, a package including a laptop, microphones and acoustic foam was provided to them.

Once the station's infrastructure was established, it was then possible for content to be assembled using scheduling software that enables presenters to record spoken content to correspond with scheduled tracks – known as Voice-tracking. Commercials and breaks for news and weather updates are then inserted by an automated system as the shows are broadcast. A live two-minute news bulletin from IRN is broadcast on the hour, followed by a national weather forecast from Radio News Hub. Although Boom Radio's content is automated in this way, many of the presenters record their spoken content shortly before it is aired to enable them to respond to real-time information, such as listener requests, and to provide reviews of the day's newspaper headlines.

Audience and music content
Upon its launch Boom Radio described itself as "a new radio station for an adventurous generation" and one that is "run by baby boomers for baby boomers".  With an estimated baby boomer population of 14 million at the time of the station's launch, Boom Radio aims to attract half a million listeners within its first two to three years on air.

The launch of Boom Radio came at a time when BBC Radio 2, a station favoured by the boomer generation, began to cut down on the number of older songs it was playing in an attempt to attract a younger audience, and in particular a demographic it described as "Mood Mums", women in their 30s and 40s with busy lives and children. On the topic of its BBC rival, Riley has said Boom Radio wants "to step on the toes of Radio 2", adding "Our view is that Radio 2 is almost relentlessly being dragged younger, so that they can appeal to people over the age of 30".

In a statement issued prior to going on air, Boom Radio said that its music output would feature music "from across the decades, peppered with selected contemporary hits". City A.M. describes Boom Radio's music output as including groups and artists such as The Beatles, Tom Jones and ABBA "as well as favourites from contemporary artists" such as Adele and George Ezra.

In October 2021, RAJAR published its first set of audience figures since the COVID pandemic, and the first to include Boom listenership. These showed a weekly audience of 233,000 with an average listening time of eight hours per week. RAJAR figures for the first quarter of 2022 indicated Boom Radio had increased its audience by 20%, with an average weekly listenership of 290,000. Figures for the second quarter of 2022 showed a weekly average audience of 336,000, an increase of 44% on its inaugural figures. RAJAR figures for the final quarter of 2022 showed that as of December 2022, the station was broadcasting to a weekly audience of 531,000, having doubled its audience to half a million in a year.  

On 26 November 2021 the station counted down its Boom Beatles Chart, a top 40 chart of Beatles tracks voted for by its listeners, with the most popular hit being "In My Life". The chart was compiled to coincide with the release of Peter Jackson's documentary series The Beatles: Get Back.

Daylong specials
On 14 August 2022, Boom presented a day of programming dedicated to pirate radio to coincide with the 55th anniversary of the Marine Offences Act 1967 that had made pirate radio stations illegal. The programming included shows presented by Johnnie Walker, John Peters (who recreated the last Big L Fab 40 countdown as broadcast on Wonderful Radio London in 1967), Roger Day, Dave Lee Travis, and Keith Skues (with a three hour show with interviews with Colin Berry, Tony Blackburn, Paul Burnett and Roger Gale).

On 20 November 2022, Boom Radio celebrated the 70th anniversary of the UK Singles Chart, with a day of programming dedicated to the charts presented by John Peters, Simon Bates, Mike Read and David Jensen. The shows included a countdown of the first chart from November 1952 presented by Peters.

Presenters
Presenters on Boom Radio include:
 Bill Bingham
 Dave Brown
 Roger Day
 Graham Dene
 David Hamilton
 Jenny Hanley
 Nicky Horne
 Dave Jamieson
 David 'Kid' Jensen
 Rob Jones
 David Lloyd
 Diana Luke
 Jane Markham
 Andy Marriott
 John Peters
 Paul Robey
 Les Ross
 Judi Spiers
 Graham Torrington
 Derek Webster
 Rod Whiting

Past presenters
 David Symonds (February – August 2021)
 Anna Raeburn (February 2021)
 Pete Murray (December 2021; December 2022)
 Bob Harris (January 2022 – February 2022)
 Esther Rantzen (February 2021 – March 2022)
 Rebecca Wilcox (February 2021 – March 2022)
 Keith Skues (August 2022)
 Dave Lee Travis (August 2022; December 2022)
 Johnnie Walker (August 2022; December 2022)
 Simon Bates (November 2022)
 Mike Read (November 2022)
 Paul O'Grady (December 2022)

See also
 Saga Radio Group, a group of stations aimed at over 50s during the 2000s
 PrimeTime Radio

References

External links
 
 Boom Radio Ltd at Companies House

Radio stations established in 2021
Radio stations in the United Kingdom
Nostalgia radio stations
Baby boomers
2021 establishments in the United Kingdom
COVID-19 pandemic in the United Kingdom